Croix-lez-Rouveroy is a village of Wallonia and a district of the municipality of Estinnes, located in the province of Hainaut.

Notes

References
 

Former municipalities of Hainaut (province)